Teddington Memorial Hospital is a community hospital in Teddington in the London Borough of Richmond upon Thames. It is operated by Hounslow and Richmond Community Healthcare NHS Trust. Its facilities include an NHS urgent treatment centre, a diagnostics department (including x-ray), two wards with beds for inpatient rehabilitation and several outpatient clinics including physiotherapy.

History
The hospital was opened as the Teddington and Hampton Wick Cottage Hospital in 1875. Thomas Chappell, of the music publishing and piano manufacturing firm, provided a site at Elfin Grove where the existing residential buildings were adapted for their new use.

It was replaced in 1929 by a new Teddington, Hampton Wick and District Memorial Hospital, intended as a memorial to those killed in the First World War. Its foundation stone had been laid the previous year by Lord Dawson of Penn, physician to the British Royal Family. By 1931 the hospital's name had been shortened to Teddington Memorial Hospital.

Teddington Memorial Hospital and Community NHS Trust was established in 1993 and dissolved in 2001. The hospital is now operated by Hounslow and Richmond Community Healthcare NHS Trust.

Transport 
The hospital is served by London Buses routes 285 and R68. The nearest railway station is Teddington on the Kingston loop line, with services provided by South Western Railway.

References

External links 
 
 Teddington Memorial Hospital on the NHS website
 Inspection reports from the Care Quality Commission
 Lost Hospitals of London – Teddington Memorial Hospital

1929 establishments in England
Cottage hospitals
Hospital buildings completed in 1929
Hospitals in Richmond upon Thames
Monuments and memorials in London
NHS hospitals in London
Teddington
World War I memorials in England